Darius Taylor (born October 2, 1978) is an American basketball coach and former player who is currently the General Manager of the Connecticut Sun of the Women's National Basketball Association (WNBA).

Career 
Taylor began his coaching career as an assistant coach at Temple in 2004 under Dawn Staley. He was later an assistant coach at South Carolina, also under Staley. He left South Carolina in 2015 after his fiancée Joni Taylor was named the head coach at Georgia.

Atlanta Dream 
Taylor was named an assistant coach for the Atlanta Dream of the WNBA on December 27, 2017. He was named interim head coach on July 24, 2021 after previous interim head coach Mike Petersen resigned due to health issues.

Connecticut Sun 
Taylor was named general manager of the Connecticut Sun on November 29, 2022.

Personal life 
Taylor's wife Joni is currently the head women's basketball coach at Texas A&M. The couple have two daughters, one born in 2016 and the other in 2019.

Head coaching record 

|-
| align="left" | Atlanta
| align="left" | 
| 13 || 2 || 11 ||  || 5th in Eastern || — || — || — || — || Missed playoffs

References

External links 
 

1978 births
Living people
Sportspeople from Chicago
Basketball players from Chicago
Basketball coaches from Illinois
Point guards
Small forwards
Michigan Wolverines men's basketball players
Temple Owls women's basketball coaches
South Carolina Gamecocks women's basketball coaches
Atlanta Dream coaches
Women's National Basketball Association general managers